Texas Bend is an unincorporated community in Mississippi County, in the U.S. state of Missouri.

Texas Bend had its start in the 1840s, and most likely was named after a nearby meander on the Mississippi River, which in turned was so named as an allusion to the size of Texas.

References

Unincorporated communities in Mississippi County, Missouri
Unincorporated communities in Missouri